This is a list of Muhammad Zafar Iqbal's work.

Science fiction

Children's literature

On math and science

Newspaper column compilations

Autobiography

Other works
 
 
 
 
 
 
 
 
 
 
 
 
 
 
 
 
 
 
 
 
 
 
 
 
 
 
 
 
 
 
 
 
 
 
 
 

Also notable that many famous dramas and cinemas of Bangladesh were made based on novels written by Muhammed Zafar Iqbal namely Shukno Ful-Rongin Ful, Bubuner Baba, Hat Kata Robin, Shat Char Dui, Dipu Number Two, Batasher Simana Akasher Thikana, Amar Bondhu Rashed, and Ekti Shundor Shokal. He has also written some dramas for different television channels. Notably, an animated film was made a year ago on his science fiction Tratuler Jogot.

Patents

References

External links
Muhammed Zafar Iqbal at Goodreads

Bibliographies by writer
Bibliographies of Bangladeshi writers